The Johannes Erickson House is a historic log cabin in Scandia, Minnesota, United States, built in 1868 with a gambrel roof, a distinctive tradition from southern Sweden.  It was moved to its current site adjacent to the Hay Lake School in 1974 to be part of a small museum complex operated by the Washington County Historical Society.  The Erickson House was listed on the National Register of Historic Places in 1976 for having local significance in the themes of architecture and exploration/settlement. It was nominated as a rare surviving example of a style brought to Minnesota by Swedish immigrants from Dalsland and Småland.

Description
The walls are of hewn oak logs, covered over with plank siding. There are two rooms on each floor. The gambrel roof allows for a full-height upper story instead of the cramped loft space of most log cabins.

Access to the upper floor was originally gained by an exterior staircase.  In its early days the house also had a lean-to at the rear for use as a summer kitchen.

History
The house was built in 1868 by Johannes Erickson and his 13-year-old son Alfred.  In 1904 the adult Alfred Erickson built a new home for the family, and the original cabin saw use over the years as a granary, a garage, and even a playhouse.  By 1974 it was no longer useful to owner Vernon Jellum, and he made plans to have it demolished or relocated.  The Washington County Historical Society purchased the building and had it moved  to its current site to form a small museum complex near a 1900 monument to the first Swedish settlers in Minnesota.

See also
 List of museums in Minnesota
 National Register of Historic Places listings in Washington County, Minnesota

References

External links

 Hay Lake School and Erickson Log Home

1868 establishments in Minnesota
Houses completed in 1868
Houses in Washington County, Minnesota
Houses on the National Register of Historic Places in Minnesota
Log buildings and structures on the National Register of Historic Places in Minnesota
Log cabins in the United States
Museums in Washington County, Minnesota
National Register of Historic Places in Washington County, Minnesota
Swedish-American culture in Minnesota
Swedish-American museums
Vernacular architecture in Minnesota